Legion Records was started in 1997 by Michael Brosnan as Goatboy Records, later changed to Goatboy Farms Recordings. It was centered in Philadelphia, Pennsylvania. The final name change (to Legion) occurred in 1999. The label specialized in the heavy metal, grindcore and sludge genres of music.

Releases
GB001 Burn the Priest / ZED (split, 7" vinyl record)
GB002 Machine That Flashes - "Resensitized" (EP, 7" vinyl record)
GB003 ZED / 309 Chorus (split, CD)
Terror13-04 Burn the Priest - Burn the Priest (full-length, compact disc)
Terror13-05 Noisegate - The Towers Are Burning (full-length, compact disc)
Terror13-06 Wormwood - "Behemoth" (EP, 7" vinyl record)

The following release by Legion Records has an unknown catalog number:

Wormwood - Requiescat (full-length, compact disc, co-release with Arm Records)

See also
 List of record labels

External links
 In-depth information on label discography at discogs.com
 http://www.freeyellow.com/members/goatboy/ @ The Internet Archive
 http://www.legionrecords.com/ @ The Internet Archive

American independent record labels
Record labels established in 1997
Heavy metal record labels
Grindcore record labels
Noise music record labels